Tsiroanomandidy  is a city (commune urbaine) in central-western Madagascar, approximately 210 kilometres west of the capital Antananarivo.

Tsiroanomandidy is the capital of Bongolava Region and of Tsiroanomandidy District. 
Its name means One person only reigns and comes from the souvenirs of the victory of king Radama I over his rival Ramitraho, King of the Sakalava in 1822.

District of Tsiroanomandidy
There are 18 communes in the district with a total of 215 villages (fokontany).
Ambalanirana - 16 villages - 450 km2 with a population of 27,805
Ambararatabe 7 villages - 120 km2 with a population of 11,699
Ambatolampy 10 villages - 152 km2 with a population of 12,584
Ankadinondry Sakay 22 villages - 376 km2 with a population of 45,522
Ankerana Avaratra 7 villages - 800 km2 with a population of 11,833
Anosy 7 villages -209 km2 with a population of 12,582
Belobaka 18 villages - 137 km2 with a population of 24,346
Bemahatazana 12 villages - 1,100 km2 with a population of 36,498
Bevato 12 villages - 357 km2 with a population of 20,360
Fierenana 11 villages - 3,336 km2 with a population of 21 625
Fihaonana 20 villages - 1,777 km2 with a population of 63,007
Mahasolo 16 villages - 934 km2 with a population of 45,485
Maroharana 7 villages - 450 km2 with a population of 12,343
Miandanarivo 11 villages - 400 km2 with a population of 17,438
Soanierana 6 villages - 248 km2 with a population of 9,285
Tsinjoarivo 10 villages - 450 km2 with a population of 31,213
Tsiroanomandidy 16 villages - 52 km2 with a population of 42,989

Transports 
The national road RN 1 and Route nationale 1b connects the city with Antananarivo (218 km).

There is an airport.

Religion
 FJKM - Fiangonan'i Jesoa Kristy eto Madagasikara (Church of Jesus Christ in Madagascar)
 Roman Catholic Diocese of Tsiroanomandidy (Cathedral of Our Lady of Good Remedy).
 FIANGONANA BATISTA BIBLIKA (Baptiste church)
 EEM - Eklesia Episkopaly Malagasy (Anglican Church of Madagascar)

Ethnic groups
Merina (55%), Betsileo, Antandroy, Antaisaka live in Tsiroanaomandidy.

Economy
Tsiroanomandidy has the largest Zebu market in Madagascar. More than 1/3 of the tax revenue of the town come from its trade.

References 

Cities in Madagascar
Populated places in Bongolava
Regional capitals in Madagascar